Abomsa is a town in central Ethiopia; Traditionally, the Etymology of the word Abomsa is ʔabbo /Abbo/ and mɨsɑ. Abbo is the short form of the Name Saint Abune Gebre Menfes Kiduss and popularly called Abbo and mɨsa is lunch. In the early period, the people who preceded at that place celebrated a memorial day for the Abune Gebre Menfes Kiduss, and after the lunch, they said we had the lunch in the name of Abbo, then they named the place Abbomɨsa. It is the administrative center of Merti woreda.

According to the Oromia Regional government, this town currently has telephone and postal service, and is provided with electricity on a 24-hour-a-day basis. 

Emperor Haile Selassie visited the veterans' resettlement project near the town on 31 December 1956, which had at the time  under cultivation. During his visit the Emperor announced that a school would be built at Abomsa.

Demographics 
Based on 2005 figures from the Central Statistical Agency, Abomsa has an estimated total population of 19,208 of whom 9,548 were men and 9,660 were women. The 1994 national census reported this town had a total population of 10,742 of whom 5,178 were men and 5,564 were women.

Notes 

Populated places in the Oromia Region